825 Naval Air Squadron is a Royal Navy Fleet Air Arm Naval Air Squadron which was re-commissioned on 10 October 2014 and currently flies the AgustaWestland Wildcat HMA2.

It was a carrier-based squadron that was formed on 8 October 1934 from the aircraft and personnel of 824 Naval Air Squadron. The squadron also saw action in later conflicts, including the Korean War and the Falklands War.

History

Pre-war history
825 Squadron's first assignment after commissioning was to board the aircraft carrier  for service on the China Station. This was short-lived, and by January 1935 both the squadron and the carrier were in the Mediterranean. The squadron was transferred to Hal Far, Malta in March, while Eagle returned to Britain for a refit.  replaced Eagle, and the squadron alternated its time between the carrier and the aerodrome at Hal Far. They returned briefly to the UK in May 1937 to attend the Coronation Fleet Review, before retaking their station in the Mediterranean, and were transferred to Admiralty control on 24 May 1939.

Wartime service

Mediterranean and the North Sea

With the outbreak of the Second World War in September 1939, 825 Squadron embarked on HMS Glorious at Dekheila, Egypt and headed into the Indian Ocean and the Red Sea to search for enemy shipping. They carried out these duties throughout the rest of 1939, returning the Mediterranean in January 1940, where they again returned to Hal Far. The squadron re-embarked on Glorious in March and sailed to Britain to defend Norway after the German invasion. On their arrival, they disembarked at RNAS Prestwick. They were active in covering the Dunkirk evacuation, during which they lost eight of their 12 aircraft; five were lost in a single bombing raid on 29 May 1940, including its commander Jimmy Buckley who was awarded the DSC for his actions during this period.

Atlantic and the Bismarck
The depleted squadron was brought up to nine aircraft in July 1940 and embarked aboard . They then operated off the Norwegian coast in September, carrying out night attacks on Trondheim and Tromsø. After the British withdrawal, the squadron remained aboard Furious, and by February 1941 was off the Gold Coast. They joined  in May 1941, and took part in the Home Fleet's hunt for the battleship . After sighting Bismarck on 24 May, aircraft from the squadron carried out an attack on 25 May, scoring a single hit which slowed her. Another series of attacks by Fairey Swordfish of 810 and 818 Naval Air Squadrons flying from  the following day succeeded in disabling Bismarcks steering gear. She was subsequently engaged by ships of the Home Fleet and sank on 27 May.

The Channel Dash
The squadron embarked on Ark Royal in June 1941 to provide cover for the Malta Convoys. Aircraft of 825 Squadron carried out raids on targets in Pantellaria, Sardinia and Sicily in September. A number of the squadron's aircraft were lost in the sinking of Ark Royal on 14 October. The remainder flew to Gibraltar, where the squadron was disbanded. It was re-formed with Fairey Swordfish at RNAS Lee-on-Solent in January 1942, and tasked with a torpedo bomber reconnaissance duties. Six of the squadron's aircraft flew off from RAF Manston to attack Scharnhorst and Gneisenau and the heavy cruiser  in the English Channel, as they carried out Operation Cerberus. The attacking aircraft failed to score any hits, and all six were lost. The Commanding Officer—Eugene Esmonde—was posthumously awarded the Victoria Cross. Five of the aircrew survived, and were also decorated.

Arctic and Atlantic convoys

After regrouping at Lee-on-Solent in March 1942, the squadron sent three aircraft aboard  where they covered the Arctic convoys to Russia. They attacked six U-boats, and shared credit with the destroyer  for sinking . The squadron then operated under No. 16 Group RAF Coastal Command, flying out of Thorney Island and Exeter.

They then embarked aboard HMS Furious in March 1943, covering convoys sailing to Iceland and making sweeps for enemy submarines off Norway. They continued in the Arctic before returning to Britain. The Swordfish were then absorbed into 815 Naval Air Squadron, followed by the Wildcats in May. 825 Squadron then ceased to exist. 825 Squadron was reformed in July 1945 at RNAS Rattray as a Canadian-manned force. This did not happen immediately, and the squadron remained a Royal Navy one.

Post-war service
The commissioning of HMCS Warrior in January 1946 led to the transferral of the squadron to the Royal Canadian Navy. It served with them until being renumbered 880 Squadron (RCN) in May 1951. The 825 designation then returned to the Royal Navy, and the squadron reformed in June 1951 at RNAS Eglinton. The squadron was recommissioned several times over the next decade, operating as an anti-submarine unit equipped with Fairey Gannets, and seeing service in the Korean War. During this period, they spent time operating off . It then re-formed at RNAS Culdrose on 16 August 1960, equipped with Whirlwind HAS.7s. The squadron was deployed in the Middle East during crises between Iraq and Kuwait in 1961. It then transferred most of its aircraft to 824 Squadron, returning to the UK aboard . In late 1961 they took part in relief operations after Mombasa was hit by flooding. They were again disbanded on 2 April 1962.

The outbreak of the Falklands War in 1982 led to the re-forming of the squadron on 3 May 1982 equipped with Sea King HAS.2/2As. The aircraft came from 706 Naval Air Squadron, or were taken from other units or storage. The squadron operated from Port San Carlos and then the Landing Site (LS) "Busby" at San Carlos Settlement where they were billeted with the local farmer. They returned to the UK in late July. They were disbanded at Culdrose on 17 September 1982.

Current formation

825 Naval Air Squadron is currently the Royal Navy’s Operational Conversion Unit for Wildcat after being re-commissioned as the Royal Navy's first frontline Wildcat HMA2 Squadron on 10 October 2014, with the merger of 700(W) Naval Air Squadron and 702 Naval Air Squadron. It operated the first four Wildcat Flights to convert and deploy to sea on Type 45 destroyers and Type 23 frigates. It delivers training to aircrew along with Air Engineers awaiting frontline qualification and is responsible for continuing Wildcat Tactical Development: identifying and understanding the significant potential of the aircraft.

Flights
 201 Flight (Wildcat HMA.2) – Voodoo – aboard  between March 2015 and December 2015.
 209 Flight (Wildcat HMA.2) between April and October 2016.

Aircraft operated

The squadron operated a variety of different aircraft and versions:
 Fairey III F
 Fairey Swordfish I, II & III
 Hawker Sea Hurricane IIc
 Grumman Wildcat VI
 Fairey Barracuda II(ASH)
 Fairey Firefly FR.1, FR.4, AS.5 & FR.5
 Fairey Gannet AS.1, T.2 & AS.4
 Westland Whirlwind HAS.7
 Westland Sea King HAS.2/2a
 AgustaWestland Wildcat HMA2

Battle honours 
825 Naval Air Squadron has received the following battle honours:

 Dunkirk 1940
 English Channel 1940–42
 Norway 1940
 Bismarck 1941
 Malta Convoys 1941
 Arctic 1942–45
 Atlantic 1944
 Japan 1945
 Korea 1952
 Falkland Islands 1982

Commanding Officers
2014-2018 Commander Simon Collins Royal Navy
2018-2020 Commander Duncan Thomas Royal Navy
2020 - present Commander Scott Simpson Royal Navy

References

Citations

Bibliography

External links

Military units and formations established in 1934
800 series Fleet Air Arm squadrons
Military units and formations of the United Kingdom in the Falklands War
Military units and formations of the United Kingdom in the Korean War